Les inqualifiables is a Moroccan comedian duo, founded in 2013 and composed of Oubeid Allah Hlal and Amine Belghazi.

Career 
On April 17, 2014, les inqualifiables made their debut on stage with the show Qui es-tu.

In 2016, they collaborated with Hassan El Fad in Hassan EL Fad ou rba3to.

In August 2017, they participated in the 1st edition of the Juste pour rire festival in Agadir.

In 2018, they participated in Gala Marocain du Marrakech du rire, as well as in Jamel Debbouze's show at Megarama in Casablanca.

In January 2019, they started a world tour with their new show Si y a moi ya toi.

In May 2019, they organize the 5th edition of the Aji Tahdam festival, which has the participation of several artists, in particular, Hanane El Fadili with her one man show Hanane Show and Amine Radi with her show Va dormir Va.

Shows 
2014: Qui es-tu? (Who are you?)

2015: 2 heures de rire (2 hours of laughter)

2015: Aji Tahdam 1

2016: Hassan EL Fad ou rba3to

2016: Aji Tahdam 2

2017: Aji Tahdam 3

2017: Les inqualifiables at Marrakech du rire

2017: Les inqualifiables at Afrique Du Rire festival

2018: Aji Tahdam festival

2018: Hadou Houma Hna

2019: Si’a moi y'a toi tour

Emissions 
 Dhak Tkhssr
 NB! بيني نويطا

Movies 
 30 million (friendly participation)

References 

Living people
Moroccan artists
Artist groups and collectives
Moroccan comedians
Year of birth missing (living people)